Meragisa dasra is a moth of the family Notodontidae. It is found in south-eastern Peru.

References

Moths described in 1904
Notodontidae